Tick-borne diseases, which afflict humans and other animals, are caused by infectious agents transmitted by tick bites. They are caused by infection with a variety of pathogens, including rickettsia and other types of bacteria, viruses, and protozoa.
The economic impact of tick-borne diseases is considered to be substantial in humans, and tick-borne diseases are estimated to affect ~80 % of cattle worldwide.

  18 tick-borne pathogens have been identified in the United States according to the Centers for Disease Control and at least 27 are known globally.
New tick-borne diseases have been discovered in the 21st century, due in part to the use of molecular assays and next-generation sequencing. 

The occurrence of ticks and tick-borne illnesses in humans is increasing. Tick populations are spreading into new areas, in part due to climate change. Tick populations are also affected by changes in the populations of their hosts (e.g. deer, cattle, mice, lizards) and those hosts' predators (e.g. foxes).  Diversity and availability of hosts and predators can be affected by deforestation and habitat fragmentation.

Because individual ticks can harbor more than one disease-causing agent, patients can be infected with more than one pathogen at the same time, compounding the difficulty in diagnosis and treatment.
As the incidence of tick-borne illnesses increases and the geographic areas in which they are found expand, health workers increasingly must be able to distinguish the diverse, and often overlapping, clinical presentations of these diseases.

Prevention

Exposure

Ticks tend to be more active during warmer months, though this varies by geographic region and climate. Areas with woods, bushes, high grass, or leaf litter are likely to have more ticks. Those bitten commonly experience symptoms such as body aches, fever, fatigue, joint pain, or rashes. People can limit their exposure to tick bites by wearing light-colored clothing (including pants and long sleeves), using insect repellent with 20%–30% N,N-Diethyl-3-methylbenzamide (DEET), tucking their pants legs into their socks, checking for ticks frequently, and washing and drying their clothing in a hot dryer.

According to the World Health Organization, tick-to-animal transmission is difficult to prevent because animals do not show visible symptoms; the only effective prevention relies on killing ticks on the livestock production facility.

Tick removal

Ticks should be removed as soon as safely possible once discovered. They can be removed either by grasping tweezers as close to the mouth as possible and pulling without rotation; some companies market grooved tools that rotate the hypostome to facilitate removal. Chemical methods to make the tick self-detach, or trying to pull the tick out with one’s fingers, are not efficient methods.

Diagnosis
In general, specific laboratory tests are not available for rapid diagnosis of tick-borne diseases. Due to their seriousness, antibiotic treatment is often justified based on clinical presentation alone.

Assessing risk
For a person or pet to acquire a tick-borne disease requires that the individual gets bitten by a tick and that the tick feeds for a sufficient period of time. The feeding time required to transmit pathogens differs for different ticks and different pathogens. Transmission of the bacterium that causes Lyme disease is well understood to require a substantial feeding period. In general, soft ticks (Argasidae) transmit pathogens within minutes of attachment because they feed more frequently, whereas hard ticks (Ixodidae) take hours or days, but the latter are more common and harder to remove.

For an individual to acquire infection, the feeding tick must also be infected. Not all ticks are infected. In most places in the US, 30-50% of deer ticks will be infected with Borrelia burgdorferi (the agent of Lyme disease). Other pathogens are much more rare. Ticks can be tested for infection using a highly specific and sensitive qPCR procedure. Several commercial labs provide this service to individuals for a fee. The Laboratory of Medical Zoology (LMZ), a nonprofit lab at the University of Massachusetts, provides a comprehensive TickReport  for a variety of human pathogens and makes the data available to the public. Those wishing to know the incidence of tick-borne diseases in their town or state can search the LMZ surveillance database.

Examples
Major tick-borne diseases include:

Bacterial
 Lyme disease or borreliosis
 Organism: Borrelia burgdorferi sensu lato (bacterium)
 Vector: at least 15 species of ticks in the genus Ixodes, including deer tick (Ixodes scapularis (=I. dammini), I. pacificus, I. ricinus (Europe), I. persulcatus (Asia))
 Endemic to: The Americas and Eurasia
 Symptoms: Fever, arthritis, neuroborreliosis, erythema migrans, cranial nerve palsy, carditis, fatigue, and influenza-like illness
 Treatment: Antibiotics - amoxicillin in pregnant adults and children), (doxycycline in other adults
 Relapsing fever (tick-borne relapsing fever, different from Lyme disease due to different Borrelia species and ticks)
 Organisms: Borrelia species such as B. hermsii, B. parkeri, B. duttoni, B.  miyamotoi
 Vector: Ornithodoros species
 Regions : Primarily in Africa, Spain, Saudi Arabia, Asia in and certain areas of Canada and the western United States
 Symptoms: Relapsing fever typically presents as recurring high fevers, flu-like symptoms, headaches, and muscular pain, with less common symptoms including rigors, joint pain, altered mentation, cough, sore throat, painful urination, and rash
 Treatment: Antibiotics are the treatment for relapsing fever, with doxycycline, tetracycline, or erythromycin being the treatment of choice.
 Typhus Several diseases caused by Rickettsia bacteria (below)
 Rocky Mountain spotted fever
 Organism: Rickettsia rickettsii
 Vector:  Wood tick (Dermacentor variabilis), D. andersoni
 Region (US): East, Southwest
 Vector: Amblyomma cajennense
 Region (Brazil): São Paulo, Rio de Janeiro, Minas Gerais.
 Symptoms:Fever, headache, altered mental status, myalgia, and rash
 Treatment: Antibiotic therapy, typically consisting of doxycycline or tetracycline
 Helvetica spotted fever
 Organism: Rickettsia helvetica
 Region(R. helvetica): Confirmed common in ticks in Sweden, Switzerland, France, and Laos
 Vector/region(s)#1: Ixodes ricinus is the main European vector.

 Symptoms: Most often small red spots, other symptoms are fever, muscle pain, headache and respiratory problems
 Treatment: Broad-spectrum antibiotic therapy is needed, phenoxymethylpenicillin likely is sufficient.
 Human granulocytic anaplasmosis (formerly human granulocytic ehrlichiosis or HGE)
 Organism: Anaplasma phagocytophilum (formerly Ehrlichia phagocytophilum or Ehrlichia equi)
 Vector: Lone star tick (Amblyomma americanum), I. scapularis
 Region (US): South Atlantic, South-central
 Bartonella: Bartonella transmission rates to humans via tick bite are not well established  but Bartonella is common in ticks. For example: 4.76% of 2100 ticks tested in a study in Germany 
 Tularemia
 Organism: Francisella tularensis, A. americanum
 Vector: D. variabilis, D. andersoni
 Region (US): Southeast, South-central, West, widespread

Viral
 Tick-borne meningoencephalitis
 Organism: TBEV (FSME) virus, a flavivirus from family Flaviviridae
 Vector: deer tick (Ixodes scapularis), Ixodes ricinus (Europe), Ixodes persulcatus (Russia + Asia))
 Endemic to: Europe and northern Asia
 Powassan virus/deer tick virus
 Organism: Powassan virus (POWV), a flavivirus from family Flaviviridae. Lineage 2 POWV is also known as deer tick virus (DTV)
 Vector: Ixodes cookei, Ix. scapularis, Ix. marxi, Ix. spinipalpusm, Dermacentor andersoni, and D. variabilis
 Endemic to: North America and eastern Russia
 Colorado tick fever
 Organism: Colorado tick fever virus (CTF), a coltivirus from the Reoviridae
 Vector: Dermacentor andersoni
 Region: US (West)
 Crimean-Congo hemorrhagic fever
 Organism: CCHF virus, a nairovirus, from the Bunyaviridae
 Vector: Hyalomma marginatum, Rhipicephalus bursa
 Region: Southern part of Asia, Northern Africa, Southern Europe
 Severe febrile illness
 Organism: Heartland virus, a phlebovirus, from the Bunyaviridae
 Vector: Lone star tick (Amblyomma americanum)
 Region: Missouri and Tennessee, United States
 Severe febrile illness, headaches, coma in 1/3 patients
 Organism: tentatively Alongshan virus, jingmenvirus group in the flavivirus family
 Vector: tick (likely Ixodes persulcatus, Ixodes ricinus), mosquitoes
 Region: Inner Mongolia but potentially more widespread

Protozoan
 Babesiosis
 Organism: Babesia microti, Theileria equi
 Vector: Ixodes scapularis (deer tick), I. pacificus (western black-legged tick)
 Region (US): Northeast, West Coast
 Cytauxzoonosis
 Organism: Cytauxzoon felis
 Vector: Amblyomma americanum (Lone star tick)
 Region (US): South, Southeast

Toxin
 Tick paralysis
 Cause: Toxin
 Vector (US): Dermacentor andersoni (Rocky Mountain wood tick), D. variabilis (American dog tick or wood tick)
 Region (US): D. andersoni: East, D. variabilis: East, West coast
 Vector (Australia): Ixodes holocyclus (Australian paralysis tick)
 Region (Australia): East

Allergies 
 Alpha-gal allergy - Alpha-gal syndrome is likely caused by a hypersensitivity reaction to the Alpha-gal (Galactose-alpha-1,3-galactose) sugar molecule introduced by ticks while feeding on a human host. The immune reaction can leave people with an allergy to red meat and other mammalian derived products.

See also 
 Arbovirus
 List of diseases spread by invertebrates
 List of insect-borne diseases
 Mosquito-borne disease
 Robovirus
 Tibovirus
 Ticks of domestic animals

References

External links 

 Tick-Borne Diseases: Recommendations for Workers and Employers—National Institute for Occupational Safety and Health
 Tickborne Diseases—National Center for Infectious Diseases (CDC)
 Tickborne Disease Website—Massachusetts Department of Public Health
 Ixodes Scapularis—3D animation of Deer or Blacklegged Tick from US Army site
 Parasitic Insects, Mites and Ticks: Genera of Medical and Veterinary Importance Wikibooks